Amenirdis (or Amonardis; masculine ỉmn-ỉr-dỉ-sw – Amenirdisu, feminine ỉmn-ỉr-dỉ-st – Amenirdiset; gendered endings were mostly not pronounced by the time the name was popular) is an ancient Egyptian name meaning "he/she was given by Amun".

Famous bearers:
 Amenirdisu or Amyrtaeus: only pharaoh of the Twenty-eighth dynasty
 Amenirdis I, God's Wife of Amun during the Twenty-fifth dynasty
 Amenirdis II, Divine Adoratrice of Amun during the Twenty-fifth dynasty

Sources

Ancient Egyptian given names
Theophoric names